City Hall Ferry Pier was a barge pier at the east of ex-Queen's Pier outside Hong Kong City Hall, Edinburgh Place, Central, Hong Kong. It had hydrofoil service to Tsim Sha Tsui East. Due to the Central and Wan Chai Reclamation, both Queen's Pier and City Hall Ferry Pier were closed and relocated to Central Piers No.7 and 8 (Star Ferry Pier) on 11 November 2006.

References

2006 disestablishments in Hong Kong
Central, Hong Kong
Demolished piers in Hong Kong
Victoria Harbour